Nichols may refer to:

People
Nichols (surname)
Nichol, a surname

Places

Canada
 Nichols Islands, Nunavut

United States
 Nichols, California, an unincorporated community
 Nichols Canyon, Los Angeles, California
 Nichols, Connecticut
 Nichols Farms Historic District, a village within Trumbull, Connecticut. 
 Nichols, Iowa
 Nichols (village), New York
 Nichols (town), New York
 Nichols, South Carolina, a town
 Nichols, Wisconsin, a village
 Nichols Shore Acres, Wisconsin, an unincorporated community

Military
 Nichols Field, a former U.S. air base in the Philippines
 Nichols' Regiment of Militia, a U.S. Revolutionary War unit
 Camp Nichols, a historic fortification in Cimarron County, Oklahoma

Organisations

Education
 Nichols College, in Dudley, Massachusetts
 Nichols School, in Buffalo, New York
 Nichols Hall, Kansas State University
 Nichols House (Baltimore, Maryland), home of the president of Johns Hopkins University
 Nichols Arboretum, Ann Arbor campus of the University of Michigan

Companies
 Nichols plc, a British soft drinks company
 Nichols Industries, Inc., an American cap gun manufacturer

Other
 Nichols (TV series), a 1971 television show
 Nichols House (disambiguation), various houses of on the National Register of Historic Places 
 Nichols Bridgeway, a pedestrian bridge in Chicago, Illinois
 Nichols railway station, a Philippine National Railways station
 Nichols plot, a plot used in signal processing and control design
 Harvey Nichols, a luxury department store based in the United Kingdom

See also
 Nicholls (disambiguation)
 Nickel (disambiguation)
 Justice Nichols (disambiguation)